Elaeocarpus cruciatus is a species of flowering plant in the Elaeocarpaceae family. It is endemic to Peninsular Malaysia. It is threatened by habitat loss.

See also
 List of Elaeocarpus species

References

cruciatus
Endemic flora of Peninsular Malaysia
Conservation dependent plants
Taxonomy articles created by Polbot
Taxa named by E. J. H. Corner